State Road 162 (NM 162) is a  state highway in the US state of New Mexico. Entirely within Rio Arriba County, NM 162's southern terminus is at U.S. Route 84 (US 84) south of Tierra Amarilla and the northern terminus is at US 64 and US 84 north of Tierra Amarilla. It is a paved, two-lane road for its entire length.

Route description
NM 162's southern terminus is at US 84 near the Rio Chama State Recreation Area south of Tierra Amarilla in unincorporated Rio Arriba County. The highway travels northeast and passes an electrical substation before an intersection with US 64 on the south side of the Rio de Tierra Amarilla, which it crosses before entering the community of Tierra Amarilla. At the county courthouse, NM 162 intersects NM 531 and turns northeast. In the northern outskirts of Tierra Amarilla, the highway intersects NM 573 where it turns northwest. The roadway continues through open land with a few houses before reaching its northern terminus at concurrent US 64 and US 84 north of Tierra Amarilla.

The New Mexico Department of Transportation (NMDOT) tracks the traffic levels on its highways. On NM 162 in 2017, they determined that on average the traffic was between 1 and 2,999 vehicles per day along the highway.

History
NM 162 was established between 1948 and 1951. It travelled from US 84 north of Tierra Amarilla along modern NM 573 to NM 512 which it followed west to US 84 in Brazos. In 1951, the entire length was an improved gravel road. By 1956, the section from US 84 to Ensenada had been paved. Between 1956 and 1958, US 84 was moved onto a new alignment slightly west of Tierra Amarilla. US 64 originally followed modern NM 68 from Taos to Espanola, then US 84 from there to Santa Fe. On November 24, 1972, AASHTO approved plans to reroute US 64 from Taos through Tres Piedras, Tierra Amarilla, and Bloomfield to Farmington along former NM 111, NM 553 and NM 17. In the 1988 renumbering, NM 512 and NM 573 were created and NM 162's northern terminus was changed to its current location.

Major intersections

See also

References

External links

162
Transportation in Rio Arriba County, New Mexico